Emmett James is a British actor.

Biography 
James is the son of Richard and Kathryn Humphries. His father was a music journalist for fleet street in the 1960s during the height on the "British Invasion". He has two brothers, Cymon and Matthew, and three sisters Amy, Georgina and Lucy. He was named after Emmett Ryker in The Virginian. He was documented in the memoir Admit One: My Life In Film. James attended Cypress Junior School and Sylvan High School. He worked at Buckinghamshire, Wisbech, England. He and Marianna Hill studied acting at the Lee Strasberg Theatre and Film Institute. He works extensively as a thespian in every single medium role. His talents were honoured with accolades. James received a prestigious ADA award for working at the Los Angeles stage for a lead role as the severely disabled boy in 'Keeping Tom Nice'. His role was widely praised among the critical press, with Backstage West commenting: "James turns in an astonishing performance in the role of the profoundly damaged Tom, we never get the sense that he's acting up there."

Producer

Actor

Film 
 Titanic – 1st Class Steward
 The Hunted – Paul
 Lap Dancing – John
 Kazaam – Manager
 The Misery Brothers –
 Wolfhound – Evrikh
 The West Side Waltz

Television 
 NYPD Blue – Emmett
 The Agency – Mike
 Redemption High – Doubt
 The Titanic Chronicles – Joseph Boxall
 The Titanic Chronicles – Ernest Gill
 The Color of War – Officer
 The Other Side – Ghost Runner

Daytime Soap 
 General Hospital – Neal McAllister
 Days of Our Lives – Heart Specialist

Theater 
 A Clockwork Orange – Los Angeles
 Paradise Revisited – Los Angeles
 Romeo & Juliet – Los Angeles
 Keeping Tom Nice – Los Angeles
 Curse of the Starving Class – London
 Maurice – London

Voice-Over 
 Pirates of the Caribbean: The Curse of the Black Pearl
 Van Wilder 2: The Rise of Taj
 Four Minutes
 Vacuums 
 War of the Buttons – Trailer

Anime
 Hellsing – Detective
 R.O.D the TV – Mirror Man
 L/R: Licensed by Royalty – Frost / Director

Video Game
 Call of Duty: Finest Hour – Allen Rowe
 The Last Remnant – Wilfred Hermeien
 Titanic Explorer – Steward

Commercials
 Microsoft
 Chrysler Cars
 Virgin Records
 Campari Alcohol
 Fox Sports
 E-Trade

Author 
 Admit One: My Life In Film

Accolades 

 Keeping Tom Nice – Tom (Recipient of the ADA Los Angeles theatre award)

References

External links 
 
 Hollywood Reporter review of King Of The Underdogs
 https://variety.com/t/sidemen/
 http://www.latimes.com/entertainment/movies/la-et-mn-mini-sidemen-glory-documentary-review-20170824-story.html
 http://www.hollywoodreporter.com/review/sidemen-long-road-glory-1030244
 https://www.wsj.com/articles/sidemen-long-road-to-glory-review-they-brought-the-blues-to-life-1503595975

1972 births
Living people
English male film actors
20th-century English painters
English male painters
21st-century English painters
20th-century English male artists
21st-century English male artists